Hosea Fortune (born March 4, 1959) is a former American football wide receiver. He played for the San Diego Chargers in 1983.

References

1959 births
Living people
American football wide receivers
Rice Owls football players
San Diego Chargers players